Jean-Loup Felicioli (born 1960) is a French film maker. In January 2012, he was nominated for an Academy Award for the movie A Cat in Paris. He also directed Phantom Boy.

Born in 1960 in Albertville, Felicioli studied at Schools of Fine Arts in Annecy, Strasbourg, Perpignan and Valence.

References

1960 births
Living people
French animators
French animated film directors
People from Albertville
Date of birth missing (living people)